The Church between the Fir trees, otherwise the Church of Saints Peter and Paul (Biserica Sfinții Petru și Pavel), is a Romanian Orthodox church located at 17 Reconstrucției Street, Sibiu, Romania.

The church is listed as a historic monument by Romania's Ministry of Culture and Religious Affairs. The church was Greek-Catholic prior to 1948, when the nascent communist regime outlawed the church and confiscated its properties.

Important 19th-century and 20th-century figures are buried in the church cemetery, including George Bariț, Alexandru Papiu Ilarian, Ioan Rațiu and Alexandru Vaida-Voevod.

References

Religious buildings and structures in Sibiu
Baroque church buildings in Romania
Former Greek-Catholic churches in Romania
Romanian Orthodox churches in Sibiu County
Historic monuments in Sibiu County
Churches completed in 1788